The 2014 Newcastle Jets FC W-League season was the club's seventh participation in the W-League, since the league's formation in 2008.

Players

Squad information

Transfers in

Transfers out

Competitions

W-League

Fixtures

League table

Results summary

Results by round

Goal scorers

Awards
 Player of the Week (Round 4) – Rhali Dobson
 Newcastle Jets Player of the Year – Emily van Egmond

References

External links
 Official Website

Newcastle Jets FC (A-League Women) seasons
Newcastle Jets